Kateřina Böhmová may refer to:

 Kateřina Böhmová (1958), Czech tennis player (the mother)
 Kateřina Böhmová (1986), Czech tennis player (the daughter)